Capitulare may mean:

 a legislative text in separate chapters - see capitularium
 certain liturgical books, notably:
 Evangeliarium
 Collectarium
 Antiphonary